United for Gran Canaria (UxGC) is a Canary Island-based political party founded by former People's Party leader in Gran Canaria José Miguel Bravo de Laguna. Ahead of the 2015 Canarian regional election, it ran in the United electoral alliance formed by Nationalist Canarian Centre, Citizens for Change, Commitment for Gran Canaria, Lanzarote Independents Party, Majorero Progressive Party, Democratic and Progressive Party and Independent Group of Moya ahead of the 2015 Canarian regional election.

The party gained its only MP in the Canarian Parliament after Lucas Bravo de Laguna Cabrera, who had run as an independent for the 2019 Canarian regional election within the Canarian Coalition banner, became the General Secretary of the Party.

Member parties
Nationalist Canarian Centre (CCN)
Citizens for Canarian Change (CIUCA)
Commitment for Gran Canaria (CGCa)
Lanzarote Independents Party (PIL)
Majorero Progressive Party (PPMAJO)
Democratic and Progressive Party (PDP)
Independent Center Group of Moya (ACIM)

Electoral performance

Parliament of the Canary Islands

Cabildo de Gran Canaria

References

Political parties in the Canary Islands
Political parties established in 2015